Super-Sleuth is a 1937 comedy film directed by Ben Stoloff. It was an early lead role for Jack Oakie.
Super Sleuth was a remade in 1946 as Genius at Work, with comedy team of Wally Brown and Alan Carney.

Plot
A film detective believes he actually has the skills to solve a real life case. Bill Martin's (Jack Oakie) boasts irritate the real detectives of the Los Angeles police, as well as studio publicist Mary Strand (Ann Sothern), who loves Bill but doesn't appreciate the actor's arrogance.

A mysterious killer known as the "Poison Pen" decides to murder Bill, annoyed with his last movie. Bill and Mary go to amateur sleuth Professor Herman (Eduardo Ciannelli) for advice, unaware that the professor and the murderer are one and the same.

By mistake, film co-star Ralph Waring (Bradley Page) is killed by the Poison Pen, and stand-in Larry Frank (Alan Bruce) is suspected of the crime. To save Bill from the killer and from himself, Mary arranges for him to be locked up, but the gullible Bill gets Professor Herman to bail him out of jail. Mary and the cops come to his rescue just in time.

Cast
 Jack Oakie as Willard "Bill" Martin
 Ann Sothern as Mary Strand
 Eduardo Ciannelli as Professor Herman
 Alan Bruce as Larry Frank
 Edgar Kennedy as Lieutenant Garrison
 Joan Woodbury as Doris Dunne
 Bradley Page as Ralph Waring
 Paul Guilfoyle as Gibbons
 Willie Best as Warts
 William Corson as Beckett
 Alec Craig as Eddie, doorman

References

External links
 
 
 
 

1937 films
1930s comedy mystery films
American comedy mystery films
American black-and-white films
1930s English-language films
Films directed by Benjamin Stoloff
Films produced by Edward Small
1937 comedy films
1930s American films